The Una River is a river of Rio de Janeiro state in southeastern Brazil. The river born of Araruama lagoon. It flows through fields north of Tamoios and São Pedro da Aldeia in the Baixadas mesoregion before it discharges into the Atlantic Ocean.

See also
List of rivers of Rio de Janeiro

References
Brazilian Ministry of Transport

Rivers of Rio de Janeiro (state)